Resistencia may refer to:
 Resistencia, Chaco, a city in Argentina 
 Resistencia International Airport (RES), an airport in Chaco Province, Argentina
 Resistencia Civil, a libertarian political movement in Venezuela
 La Resistencia (film), a 1972 Argentine film
 La Resistencia (gang), Mexican gang
 Resistencia S.C., a football club in Paraguay
 Resistencia (horse), a Thoroughbred racehorse